The 2019 Atlantic Coast Conference women's soccer season was the 31st season of women's varsity soccer in the conference.

The North Carolina Tar Heels were the defending regular season champions.  The Florida State Seminoles were the defending ACC tournament champions.

Teams

Stadiums and locations 

1.  Georgia Tech does not sponsor women's soccer

Coaches

Coaching changes

Pre-Season
Boston College's coach Allison Foley resigned on December 12, 2018, citing the desire to pursue other opportunities.  Jason Lowe was named as her replacement on January 9, 2019.
Syracuse coach Phil Wheddon resigned on October 26, 2018, citing the desire to pursue other opportunities.  Nicky Adams was hired as his replacement on February 25, 2019.

Head Coaching Records

Notes
Records shown are prior to the 2019 season
Years at school includes the 2019 season

Pre-season

Hermann Trophy Watchlist

The ACC had 12 players named to the MAC Hermann Trophy preseason watch list.

Pre-season poll
The 2019 ACC Preseason Poll was be announced on August 8, 2019.  The defending regular season champions, North Carolina were voted to repeat their regular season crown.  Florida State was voted in second place, even though they received two more first place votes than North Carolina.  The leagues 14 head coaches also voted on a preseason All-ACC team.  Full results for the coaches poll and preseason team are shown below.

Pre-season coaches poll

Source:

Pre-season All-ACC Team

Source:

Regular season

Conference matrix

The table below shows head-to-head results between teams in conference play.  Each team plays 10 matches.  Each team does not play every other team.

Rankings

United Soccer

Top Drawer Soccer

Players of the Week

Postseason

ACC tournament

NCAA tournament

Awards and honors

All-Americans

ACC Awards

Source:

2020 NWSL Draft

References